Te Amo, Maging Sino Ka Man (International title: Te Amo, Speaking the Language of Love / ) is a 2004 Philippine television drama romance series broadcast by GMA Network. Directed by Khryss Adalia and Lore Reyes, it stars Iza Calzado and Segundo Cernadas. It premiered on February 2, 2004 on the network's Telebabad line up. The series concluded on September 17, 2004 with a total of 162 episodes.

Cast and characters

Lead cast
 Iza Calzado as Rosela Atilado
 Segundo Cernadas as Principe Aragon de Montenegro

Supporting cast
 Jomari Yllana as Rodelio Gamban
 Angelu de Leon as Colette Camacho
 Tonton Gutierrez as Minong Gamban
 Elizabeth Oropesa as Belinda Manalo
 Jennifer Sevilla as Gemma Manalo
 Jaclyn Jose as Carol Canonigo
 Johnny Delgado as Arnaldo Camacho
 Princess Punzalan as Amanda Camacho
 Ryan Eigenmann as Edwin Camacho
 Wilma Doesnt as Undang Banal

Guest cast
 Ara Mina as Destiny
 Ian Veneracion as Amiel
 Kier Legaspi as Flip
 Jan Marini Alano as Letty
 Perla Bautista as Catalina
 Raquel Montesa as Mercy
 Mike "Pekto" Nacua as Nomi
 Shermaine Santiago as Marie
 Irma Adlawan as Olivia
 Lexi Schulze as Margarita
 Basti Samson as Billy
 Jaime Fabregas as Antonio
 Orestes Ojeda as Crispin

References

External links
 

2004 Philippine television series debuts
2004 Philippine television series endings
Filipino-language television shows
GMA Network drama series
Philippine romance television series
Television shows set in the Philippines